Logan is an unincorporated community in Logan Township, Dearborn County, Indiana.

History
A post office was established at Logan in 1836, and remained in operation until it was discontinued in 1927. The community took its name from Logan Township.

Geography

References

External links

Unincorporated communities in Dearborn County, Indiana
Unincorporated communities in Indiana